Thomas Banks was an English professional rugby league footballer who played in the 1930s.

Playing career

International honours
Thomas Banks won a cap for England while at Huddersfield in 1931 against Wales.

Challenge Cup Final appearances
Thomas Banks played right-, i.e. number 10, in Huddersfield's 21–17 victory over Warrington in the 1932–33 Challenge Cup Final at Wembley Stadium, London on Saturday 6 May 1933.

References

External links

England national rugby league team players
English rugby league players
Huddersfield Giants players
Place of birth missing
Place of death missing
Rugby league second-rows
Year of birth missing
Year of death missing